In jurisprudence,  describes the  of a person who willfully kills another human being.

Latin legal terminology